The FA Cup 1968–69 is the 88th season of the world's oldest football knockout competition; The Football Association Challenge Cup, or FA Cup for short. The large number of clubs entering the tournament from lower down the English football league system meant that the competition started with a number of preliminary and qualifying rounds. The 30 victorious teams from the Fourth Round Qualifying progressed to the First Round Proper.

Preliminary round

Ties

Replays

1st qualifying round

Ties

Replays

2nd replay

2nd qualifying round

Ties

Replays

2nd replay

3rd qualifying round

Ties

Replays

2nd replay

4th qualifying round
The teams that given byes to this round are Enfield, Wimbledon, Yeovil Town, Hereford United, South Shields, Chelmsford City, Bath City, Weymouth, Romford, Wigan Athletic, Corby Town, Guildford City, Grantham, Altrincham, Kidderminster Harriers, Nuneaton Borough, Oxford City, Runcorn, Barnet, Macclesfield Town, Boston United, Walthamstow Avenue, Tow Law Town and Lowestoft Town.

Ties

Replays

2nd replay

1968–69 FA Cup
See 1968-69 FA Cup for details of the rounds from the First Round Proper onwards.

External links
 Football Club History Database: FA Cup 1968–69
 FA Cup Past Results

Qual